No Money may refer to:

 No Money (manga) 
 No Money (song), 2016 house song by Galantis
 "No Money", song by Kings of Leon from Come Around Sundown 2010
 No Money, EP by The Dugites 1970

See also
 No Money Enterprise, an Australian drill group